Irritating Stick, also known as , is a PlayStation video game published by Jaleco Entertainment.

History 
Irritating Stick was originally released in Japan on March 19, 1998, under the name Dengeki Iraira Bou, and in North America on February 3, 1999.

Description 
It is based a segment on the Japanese game show . The segment in turn was based on a carnival game, where the player tries to maneuver a metal rod through a metal maze without touching the sides. When the sides were touched by the baton, the controller rumbles.

The player would also hear a loud announcer screaming to confuse them while trying to escape the maze. In the American version of the game, the voices (except for when the maze is finished) were removed for unknown reasons.

There is also a demo of the Japanese version released in North America in 1998 on the "PlayStation Underground Jampack" in the "imports" section of the vault where it was spelled: "Ira-Ira Bo". The player could only play up to level three, and some of the features were removed such as "multiplayer", "TV studio", "bonus", and "options". Besides some of the removed content everything else such as the voice acting, narration, and intro movie were still there. Japanese PlayStation games would not work on the American PlayStation console, since this was a direct transfer of the game from the original disk, when a level is beaten or the player gets a "game over," the PlayStation console must be restarted.

Reception

The game received "unfavorable" reviews according to the review aggregation website GameRankings. It was voted the #1 worst game name of all time by GameRevolution. In Japan, however, Famitsu gave it a score of 29 out of 40.

Notes

See also
Ucchan Nanchan no Honō no Challenge: Denryū Ira Ira Bō

References

External links
 

1998 video games
Multiplayer and single-player video games
PlayStation (console) games
PlayStation (console)-only games
Puzzle video games
Saurus games
Video games based on game shows
Video games developed in Japan
Video games scored by Masahiko Hataya
Jaleco games